Rahul Sharma (born 14 September 1960 in New Delhi) was a former Hong Kong cricketer. A stylish batsman, he made his ODI debut as captain in the Asia Cup against Bangladesh aged 43. He had previously opened for Delhi in the 1986–87 Ranji Trophy match against Himachal Pradesh. His only other first-class appearance, an interval exceeding 18 years, was for Hong Kong against Nepal in 2005 in the ICC Inter-Continental Cup.

References

Notes

1960 births
Living people
Delhi cricketers
Hong Kong cricketers
Hong Kong One Day International cricketers
Hong Kong people of Indian descent
Indian cricketers
Hong Kong cricket captains
Indian emigrants to Hong Kong